Friday Night Lights is an American television drama that aired on NBC and DirecTV (The 101 Network) between 2006 and 2011 based on the book of the same name. The show, set in the fictional town of Dillon, Texas, is about a varsity high school football team. Many of the people in the book have been adapted into similar characters.

Cast

Main characters
 Eric Taylor (Kyle Chandler) — The varsity football coach of the Dillon Panthers, based on real-life coach Gary Gaines. Like Gaines, Taylor is the new coach who struggles adjusting to the intensity that Dillon shows for football. Taylor is often conflicted with the advice he is given by local supporters of the team. After the team advances to the state tournament at the end of Season 1 under his leadership, Taylor leaves Dillon to accept a higher level job at a college, also in Texas, only to return to Dillon early in Season 2. At the end of Season 3, a series of political moves result in Taylor losing his job and moving to the re-opened, and much more poorly-funded East Dillon High. Eric rebuilds the program at East Dillon and leads them to a State Championship before moving to Philadelphia to support Tami at the end of the series.
 Tami Taylor (Connie Britton) — The wife of Eric Taylor and mother of Julie Taylor. She begins the series as the guidance counselor at Dillon High School. At the start of Season 2 she gives birth to another baby girl, Gracie Belle, and in Season 3 she becomes principal of the school, remaining there after her husband moves to East Dillon in Season 4. After the conservative community demands an apology from Tami regarding an incident that involved an abortion, Tami resigns as school principal and intends to become the guidance counselor at East Dillon. In Season 5, she is offered the position of Dean of Admissions for the fictional Braemore College in Philadelphia, which she eventually accepts in the series finale.
 Julie Taylor (Aimee Teegarden) — The older daughter of Eric and Tami Taylor. She begins the series as a freshman at Dillon High School and becomes the girlfriend of Matt Saracen. In Season 4, despite having earned an interview at Boston College, Julie ultimately turns down the offer, realizing that her heart remains in Dillon. In the season finale Julie and Matt break up and go their separate ways. However, their paths cross once again in Season 5 when Julie goes to Chicago to see Matt after making some bad decisions. During her visit, they kiss and Matt gives Julie the belief that she should stop running from what she's done wrong. She again leaves and their relationship remains ambiguous. However Matt, spurred on by her visit in Chicago, arrives in Dillon and proposes, and Julie says yes. Eight months later, they are living happily in Chicago at the conclusion of the series.
Matt Saracen (Zach Gilford) — The quarterback/wide receiver of the Dillon Panthers who also becomes the boyfriend of Julie Taylor. He struggles with abandonment, once summing it up as that he was left by Coach Taylor for a better team, left by Julie Taylor for a better guy, and left by his father for a war. Beyond this, his mother left him around age ten, before the events of the show, and returns in Season 3 to help him take care of his grandmother. Saracen is based on Mike Winchell. Saracen graduates at the end of Season 3 but remains in the cast. In Season 4, after the death of his father, he moves to Chicago in order to pursue a career in art.
 Tim Riggins (Taylor Kitsch) — The fullback/running back of the Panthers. He is the troubled best friend of Jason Street and ex-boyfriend of Tyra Collette. He later dates Lyla Garrity, with whom he has an off and on relationship. Both were stops in quite a long line of girls, as Riggins is known as a bit of a womanizer. He solves many of his problems through promiscuous sex and heavy drinking. Tim is based on Don Billingsley from the film. Both Tim and Don have rocky relationships with their fathers. Both are very good players and heavy partiers. In the Season 4 finale, Tim turns himself in to protect Billy after it is discovered they were running a chop shop.
 Landry Clarke (Jesse Plemons) – A somewhat nerdy freshman. Mistakenly called "Lance" by Coach Eric Taylor, Landry eventually accepts. He is the best friend of quarterback Matt Saracen, but wasn't on the football team in Season 1. He joined the team to impress his father in Season 2. He has his own band and is in love with Tyra Collette. Landry is based on Brian Chavez. Like Chavez, Landry is best friends with the quarterback. Both characters have very good grades and await a life outside of Dillon/Odessa. He also has some similarities to Jerrod McDougal, a diminutive player who was not portrayed in the 2004 film. In Season 4, having moved to East Dillon High, Landry becomes the team captain along with Howard, and Cafferty. Landry makes the team as a kicker and makes the season-ending game-winning field goal against the Panthers. In Season 5, Landry goes off to college at Rice University in Houston.
 Tyra Collette (Adrianne Palicki) — Former Dillon High 'bad girl,' she cleans up her act after Tami takes her under wing. Her dating history includes Tim Riggins, Landry, and a cowboy named Cash. She is seen developing throughout the show and hoping to rise above the stereotype of the blonde, oversexed female in Dillon. She was admitted into University of Texas in Austin after graduating from Dillon High and expresses the desire to go into politics in the series finale.
 Jason Street (Scott Porter) — The former star quarterback and former fiancé of Lyla Garrity. Street was paralyzed from the chest down during the first game of his senior year and developed an interest in quad rugby. He was briefly an assistant coach of the Dillon Panthers. He ends up in Northern New Jersey with his wife Erin and their son Noah, working as a sports agent.
 Lyla Garrity (Minka Kelly) — Daughter of Buddy Garrity, former fiancée of Jason Street and former captain of the cheerleaders. She initially tries to maintain her relationship with Street after his accident, but ends up cheating on him with Tim Riggins, which causes a rift between Jason and the two of them. After the divorce, her mother and younger brother and sister move away while she stayed in Texas with Buddy. In Season 2, she quits cheerleading and becomes very religious after her relationship with Jason falls apart and her parents get divorced. She later dates Tim and almost follows him to San Antonio State. Lyla leaves the show at the end of Season 3 to attend Vanderbilt University. She reappears in the season 4 episode "The Son" attending the funeral of Henry Saracen, Matt's dad. In her final appearance in the following episode, she implores Tim to move on from their relationship before returning to Vanderbilt.
 Brian "Smash" Williams (Gaius Charles) — Former running back of the Dillon Panthers. Ended up playing for Texas A&M University in College Station, Texas. The character is based on Boobie Miles (played by Derek Luke in the film). Smash wants to get to the NFL so he can support his family, but hits several snags when he decides to use steroids in Season 1 and gets into a fight as a result of racist comments in Season 2. He is injured between the second and third season, but Taylor helps him rehab and get a walk on with Texas A&M, where he is a successful college player. 
 Luke Cafferty (Matt Lauria) – A character introduced in season 4, initially Tim Riggins' replacement at tailback. Previously a standout on West Dillon's JV team, he has to attend East Dillon when it is discovered that he actually lives in the East Dillon district but has been lying about his address so he can continue to play for West Dillon. His parents, unlike most of the other parents, are not supportive of his involvement in football. Despite being moved to East Dillon, he remains friends with J.D. McCoy, which eventually ends after J.D.'s increased arrogance. Luke gets Becky Sproles pregnant on their first encounter in Season 4, causing her to be wary of him for some time. He eventually wins her heart during his senior year. Luke spends much of the 5th season conflicted about whether or not to go to a Division 3 college and play football once it becomes clear he will not get any offers from larger universities. After advice from Riggins, Luke becomes more focused for the upcoming state championship than worrying about a football scholarship. Luke and his teammates pull off a shock when they reach the state final and win. Eight months after the state final, Luke enlists in the United States Army.
 Vince Howard (Michael B. Jordan) – Introduced in Season 4, Howard is a talented athlete but had never played football before being given the choice of joining the new East Dillon football team versus going to juvenile detention. After sending his mother to drug rehab, Vince becomes East Dillon's new quarterback, and leads them to a win in the Season 4 finale. Vince is overwhelmed by all the attention he is receiving from colleges and becomes arrogant and selfish in Season 5. Vince's overbearing father is seen at the sidelines standing next to Jason, who is back in Dillon for a visit, repeatedly dropping somewhat unsubtle hints about which college to choose, much to Jason and Taylor's concern. Taylor benches Vince as his behavior was beginning to alienate teammates, potentially damaging the morale of the team. Seeing the error of his ways, Vince matures and leads the Lions to State. When we meet Vince, his father is in jail and Vince is running with a bad crowd, but he stands up to his father and takes care of his mother when his father is released from jail. Eight months later, Vince is the quarterback for the rival school.
 Jess Merriweather (Jurnee Smollett) – Introduced in Season 4, Merriweather is an East Dillon student whose father was a former state-championship winning quarterback of the East Dillon Lions but came to resent the sport and the team. Merriweather carries the responsibility for working in her family's restaurant and caring for her three younger brothers. By the end of Season 4, after a brief relationship with Landry, Jess becomes Vince's girlfriend. In Season 5, Jess decides to become a coach and starts shadowing Coach Taylor. Her relationship with Vince reaches a rocky patch when he starts acting selfishly. They briefly break up, but eventually fix things by the end of the season get back together before the Lions go to State. Jess later informs Coach that she is moving to Dallas because her father's fast-food franchise took off; Taylor tells her he knows a coach in Dallas and will recommend her.
 Becky Sproles (Madison Burge) – An East Dillon student/beauty-queen hopeful. Becky undergoes an abortion late in Season 4 after a one-night stand with Luke Cafferty, and leans on Tim Riggins for support. Becky's decision to terminate the pregnancy lands Tami Taylor in hot water, eventually costing her her job. In Season 5 Becky and Luke eventually get back together and she starts living with Billy and Mindy when her mother leaves town for a casino trip and she's mistreated by her stepmom, and Billy and Mindy treat her as real family. In the series finale, Becky moves back with her mom after she come backs from their trip, but she promises to visit Billy and Mindy. She is the only main character who is first a recurring character before being promoted in another season. All other main characters were first billed as main characters in the seasons they were introduced in.
Hastings Ruckle (Grey Damon) – Hastings is discovered by Buddy Garrity and convinced by Luke Cafferty and Vince Howard to join the East Dillon football team instead of the basketball team. He becomes a talented receiver, helping the team win their State Championship. It is unclear whether he joins the Dillon Panthers "super team," or if he returns to playing basketball for East Dillon.

Recurring characters

Introduced in Season 1
 Buddy Garrity (Brad Leland) – Owner of a popular Chevrolet dealership in town, father of Lyla Garrity, and an influential Dillon Panthers alumnus and member of the booster club. He and his ex-wife Pam have three children: Lyla, Tabby and Buddy Jr. He played college football for the Texas Longhorns. His loud-mouthed, straight-talking pragmatism puts off Coach Taylor but they come to have a good working relationship and he genuinely has the team's best interests at heart (even if it comes out the wrong way). He ends up having an affair with Angela Collette, Tyra's mom, which causes stress with his family and results in a messy divorce. Buddy is based on John Aubrey, a character Leland himself played in the film. By the third season, Joe McCoy, a wealthy member of the booster club, stages a "coup" to replace Taylor as Panthers head coach with his own son J.D.'s personal trainer Wade Aikmen, prompting Garrity, who felt ashamed of the McCoys' behavior to denounce his allegiance to the Panthers and join the Lions instead, becoming instrumental in providing sponsors, including hosting a weekly pro-Lions radio show at a local station. Buddy sells his dealership and opens a bar in East Dillon in Season 5, and his ex-wife Pam sends his son, Buddy Jr. to live with him when he begins acting out. When the Dillon Independent School District chooses the Panthers to be the lone football team in Dillon, Buddy is offered to come back as President of the Panthers booster club, which he accepts. In the season finale ending, he is seen driving around the golf cart that Joe drove Wade around the field during practices. He also has a sign hung over the Coach's office "Clear Eyes, Full Hearts, Cant Lose", a homage to former Dillon Panthers Coach Taylor.
 Buddy Garrity Jr. (Jeff Rosick and Joey Truty) – son of Buddy Garrity and brother to Lyla Garrity, Buddy starts off as just a little kid, but after moving to California starts to act out and disrespect authority causing him to move back to Texas with Buddy. He eventually joins the East Dillon Lions to get straightened out, but due to an injury is forced to sit out for the majority of the season. He ultimately becomes a part of the Dillon super-team. As an East Dillon Lion he wore the number 42.
 Tabby Garrity (Kate Krause) – daughter of Buddy Garrity and sister to Lyla Garrity and Buddy Garrity Jr. She is a little kid in the beginning of the series. After her parents divorce, she moves to California with her mother and stepfather. She returns to Dillon to visit her father and sister in Season 3, but takes a while to show respect to her father. After this, she is never seen again.
 Pam Garrity (Merrilee McCommas) – wife of Buddy Garrity, and mother to Lyla, Buddy Jr. and Tabby. She divorces him in Season 1 after he has an affair with Angela Collette. In Season 2 she remarries a man named Kevin. Between Season 2 and 3, she and Kevin move to California, along with Buddy Jr. and Tabby. In Season 5, she sends Buddy Jr. back to Dillon to live with Buddy after he starts to act out.
 Billy Riggins (Derek Phillips) — Older brother to Tim Riggins, acts as his legal guardian since both parents were absent from their lives. When he took in Tim, he was about to go to college on a golf scholarship but was forced to give it up to care for Tim. Like Tim, he played for the Dillon Panthers. Married Mindy Colette, older sister of Tim's ex-girlfriend Tyra, at the end of Season 3. He also starts a car repair business, Riggins Rigs. In Season 4, after increasing pressure from a pregnant Mindy and himself to provide for his family, he opens a chop shop to make ends meet. When Tim takes the fall for him, he becomes a coach at East Dillon and helps take care of Becky Sproles while Tim is in jail. In Season 5, he and Mindy find out they have twins on the way. In the finale, he is shown coaching for the new Dillon Panthers super-team.
 Walt Riggins (Brett Cullen) – Father to Tim and Billy Riggins. He abandoned the family just as Billy was about to go to college. In Season 1 Tim seeks him out, as he needs his signature on a document. Walt seemingly tries to reconnect with Tim, and Tim attempts to accept this, despite Billy's warnings. After Walt steals the camera used to record games, Tim realizes Billy was right.
 Lorraine Saracen (Louanne Stephens) — Grandmother to Matt Saracen, she often requires special care from Matt. She suffers from dementia. She acts as a motherly figure in Matt's life since his father is never around.
Henry Saracen (Brent Smiga) – The father of Matt Saracen who was divorced from Matt's mother when Matt was young. He enlisted in the US Army and served in Iraq. He served for twenty years, missing much of Matt's life and leaving Matt to care for his grandmother. In Henry's absence, Matt often lacked a father figure and would turn to either Coach Taylor or his good friend Landry for advice, leading to a growing rift between father and son. The character is killed off by an IED in Iraq at the end of Episode 4 of Season 4, "A Sort of Homecoming;" Episode 5, "The Son" deals with Matt's reaction to his father's death. Matt's feelings of anger toward his father are revealed and the best thing he can say at his father's funeral is that he served his country well.
 Corrina Williams (Liz Mikel) — Mother to “Smash” Williams. She found the steroids in his room and went to Coach Taylor about it, briefly putting his career in jeopardy. Works in town as a nurse, and was the one to tell Tami Taylor she was pregnant at the end of Season 1. She supports Smash's football aspirations but also keeps him grounded, encouraging him to consider his education in addition to a potential pro career. She and her daughters disappear from the series after Smash leaves for college.
Sheila Williams (Whitney MCCauley) – Older Sister to Smash Williams
Noannie Williams (Nieko Mann) – Younger Sister to Smash Williams
 Waverly Grady (Aasha Davis) — The preacher's daughter and former girlfriend to “Smash” Williams. Her bipolar disorder eventually leads to the end of their relationship.
 Reverend Grady (Sid Johnson) – A preacher in town, Waverly's father.
 Mitchell and Joanne Street (Mark Nutter and Katherine Willis) — Jason Street's parents. Their occupations remain ambiguous. After Jason's injury, they were forced to mortgage the house to pay for his medical expenses and home renovations, prompting them to sue Coach Taylor for compensation. The decision to sue Coach Taylor caused some tension in the house, which upset Jason, who considered Taylor to be a mentor and was close to both parents. The Streets are portrayed as the "All-American" family in the show. They dote on Jason, presumably their only child, and were often seen cheering him on at football games. After Jason leaves Dillon for New York City in season 3, they are not mentioned again.
 Herc (Kevin Rankin) — Athlete with the same injury as Jason Street, he's Jason's roommate in the rehab center after his accident. He takes Jason under his wing and gets him interested in quad rugby. They later become roommates and go in on a real estate venture together before Jason leaves for the northeast.
 Angela Collette (Dana Wheeler-Nicholson) — Mother of Tyra Collette and former mistress to Buddy Garrity. She ends up having an affair with Buddy, which ultimately destroys his family life once it is revealed that Buddy has been repeatedly unfaithful to Lyla's mother for years.
 Mindy Collette-Riggins (Stacey Oristano) – Hard-edged sister to Tyra Collette and Billy Riggins's wife, Mindy works as a stripper at a local roadhouse, The Landing Strip. Unlike Tyra, she fully embraces a trashy image and reputation. Initially a minor character, as the series developed the character was more heavily featured, especially in the last two seasons where she was further fleshed out and revealed to have rather strong, underlying empathetic qualities. A sister figure to Becky, she and Billy have their own son, Stevie, and are expecting twins in Season 5.
 Mac MacGill (Blue Deckert) — Offensive coordinator for the Dillon Panthers. There is initially tension between him and Eric, as he assumed the head coaching position would be his before Eric was hired. Caused the black players on the team to walk off the team in the week leading up to a playoff game in Season 1 after making politically incorrect comments. Later defended Smash after the rival team's police tried to arrest him for starting a brawl in the game. In Season 3, he suffers a heart attack and takes a leave of absence from coaching, and is replaced by future coach Wade Aikmen. In Season 4, Coach Taylor offered him a job at East Dillon, but Mac politely turned him down. In Season 5, MacGill has succeeded Aikmen as the head coach of the Dillon Panthers. After that football season, it was unclear if Mac remained head coach, was demoted back to assistant coach, or left the team entirely.
 Coach T.C. Crowley (Timothy Crowley) – Assistant coach for the Dillon Panthers from seasons 1–4. He took up Coach Taylor's offer to coach for the East Dillon Lions, making him Coach Taylor's right-hand man. Was upset on how the East Dillon Lions players reacted on easily beating the Dillon Panthers in their second matchup, putting him at odds with both Coach Taylor and Coach Riggins for a short amount of time. Returned to the Dillon Panthers "super team" in the season finale East Dillon's football program was shut down.
 Coach Spivey (Aaron Spivey-Sorrells) – Assistant coach for the Dillon Panthers. Joined the East Dillon Lions in Season 5. He is known for hyping the team up on the way to away games. Returned to the Panthers "super team" in the season finale after East Dillon's football program was shut down.
 Bobby "Bull" Reyes (Walter Perez) – An outside linebacker of the Dillon Panthers in the early episodes of Season 1. In "Who's Your Daddy" he is among those who vandalize the car of the Arnett Meade Tigers' quarterback. He is a minor character until the episode "El Acidente" in which he assaults Kurt Kaster, one of Matt's friends, for calling football a stupid game. Initially he claims Kaster was racist toward him, calling him a wetback (Voodoo said this), but Matt later reveals the truth to Coach Taylor. Coach Taylor kicks Reyes off the team after Reyes admits this. After this episode, he is never seen or mentioned again. As a Dillon Panther he wore the number 40.
 Bradley Cole (James Powers) - A defensive end of the Dillon Panthers. He rarely speaks, and is often seen in the background.  He allows Matt and Julie to use his family's lake house for their "first time" in "I Think We Should Have Sex". In "Seeing Other People", when Tim Riggins returns to the team, he is the first person Riggins apologizes to. He appears throughout Season 1 and Season 2, but does not appear from Season 3 onward, presumably having graduated. As a Dillon Panther he wore the number 55. In "Black Eyes and Broken Hearts" and "State" he wore the number 56.
 Ray “Voodoo” Tatum (Aldis Hodge) — A Louisiana resident who was displaced by Hurricane Katrina, hence the nickname, and Panther quarterback for two weeks after being brought to town by Buddy Garrity to replace Matt Saracen. The other players are quickly turned off by his refusal to befriend them. He tells Coach Taylor that this situation was a "marriage of convenience" as it benefited both parties and confesses that he felt out of place in Texas and yearns for his hometown in Louisiana. In the third game, against the Tigers, he refused to follow Coach Taylor's game plan, which confused his teammates and left them a touchdown behind at the half. During the halftime team meeting he is confronted by a furious Coach Taylor and his violent temper led to him being expelled from the team right then and there. The Panthers end up having to forfeit the game he led them to win after it is discovered he was not eligible to play for them. The Dillon Panthers meet him again in the State Final against his current high school West Cambria at the end of Season 1. Prior to the game, he attempts to play mind games with Smash by trying to entice him to West Cambria. As a Dillon Panther, and later as a West Cambria Mustang he wore the number 9.
 Jackie Miller (Brooke Langton) – Single mother to Bo Miller, who moves in next door to the Riggins brothers. She sleeps with Tim Riggins and in Season 2, Billy Riggins, causing a temporary rift between the brothers. She leaves the series, when she and Billy break up in Season 2.
 Bo Miller (Jae Head) – Jackie's son, who idolizes Tim Riggins. After he is bullied, Tim teaches him how to defend himself, becoming closer to Jackie as a result of spending time with him. Tim later gives Jackie two tickets for the state final, saying they are for Bo.
 Suzy (Alexandra Holden) – A tattoo artist who Jason meets in Season 1. They share a kiss, which Lyla sees, temporarily damaging their relationship.
 Kurt Kaster (Brent McGregor) – A friend of Matt and Landry's since seventh grade. He is beaten up by Bobby Reyes to the point of hospitalization following his claiming football is a stupid game (while Reyes is riled up). Reyes later lies and claims Kaster was racist toward him. Landry attempts to get Matt to do something; after Matt refuses, Landry says he has crossed over. Matt later confesses to Coach Taylor that Kaster isn't racist. He is later shown to be part of Landry's band, which he quits.
 Mayor Lucy Rodell (Libby Villari) – the mayor of Dillon, and big supporter of the Dillon Panthers.
 Slammin' Sammy Meade (David Cowgill) - The commentator of the football games in Dillon.
 Lois (Megan Moser) - A friend of Julie, who Tami initially prefers to Tyra.

Introduced in Season 2
Gracie Belle Taylor (Madilyn Landry) – Younger Daughter of Eric and Tami Taylor
 Bill McGregor (Chris Mulkey) — Former head coach of the Dillon Panthers. He replaced Coach Taylor at the beginning of season 2 after the latter left for TMU. Thanks to some manipulating from Buddy Garrity, he was fired after the second game (a loss). Known as the "Tennessee Tyrant" for his heavy-handed take-no-prisoners approach to coaching, in contrast to Taylor's more casual style.
 Chad Clarke (Glenn Morshower) — Father of Landry Clarke, Dillon Panthers alumnus, and police sergeant for the Dillon Police Department. He tries to protect Landry when he gets into trouble in Season 2.
 Mary Clarke (Carol Farabee) – Mother of Landry Clarke.
 Santiago Herrera (Benny Ciaramello) — Befriends Lyla Garrity after getting out of juvy. Despite his criminal record, Santiago had surprisingly good grades in school, as revealed by then-guidance counselor Tami Taylor. Buddy Garrity gives him a job and a place to stay and the two develop a father-son like relationship. Santiago joins the football team, where he becomes a standout defensive player. Due to the writers' strike, his storyline was abandoned the following season and the character disappeared from the series entirely. As a Dillon Panther he wore the number 59.
 Carlotta Alonso (Daniella Alonso) – A live in nurse who comes to help Matt and Lorraine due to her worsening mental condition. Matt develops a crush on her, despite having a girlfriend. He later breaks up with her to be with Carlotta. Carlotta at first resists, but later sleeps with him, taking his virginity. Their relationship ends after she returns to her family in Guatemala.
 Shelley Hayes (Jessalyn Gilsig) – Tami Taylor's immature sister, who comes to help after Gracie is born. Her behavior causes Julie to think about how she has acted. Later she becomes a real estate agent.
 Noelle Davenport (Jana Kramer) – The sister of a Panther player who graduated two years before Season 2. She and Smash begin a relationship in this season. Both her parents and Smash's mother disapprove, because she and Smash are of different races. She, Smash and Noannie later see a movie, where both she and Noannie are harassed by teenagers due to her relationship with Smash. Smash defends their honor, which results in his suspension for three games.
 Chris Kennedy (Matt Czuchry) – A Christian youth leader in the same group Lyla joins in Season 2. He and Lyla later begin dating, though this does not prevent Tim Riggins from stalking her. He is a DJ on a Christian radio station. In Season 3, he is neither seen nor mentioned, due to Lyla's abusive relationship with Tim.
 Erin Street (Tamara Jolaine) – A waitress who drives Jason home after a blind date gone wrong. She sleeps with him that night, and becomes pregnant. When she finds out, she tells him she wants an abortion, as she is nineteen. He realizes her pregnancy is next to impossible, due to fertility problems associated with paraplegia, and realizing he may never have another chance to be a father, tries to convince her to keep the child. In Season 3, she has had the child, a boy named Noah, and is apparently still in a relationship with Jason, though they do not live together. She eventually moves back to New Jersey to live with her parents, taking Noah with her. This motivates Jason to get a job in New York. He succeeds, getting an entry-level position at a sports agency. He promises to always be there for her, which she accepts. In Season 5, it is established by Jason that he and Erin are now married, and she wants to have another child.
 Glenn Reed (Steven Walters) – A teacher at Dillon High who forms a friendship with Tami after she returns from maternity leave. In Season 4 he kisses Tami while drunk at happy hour, and shamefully confesses this to Eric.
 Anton "The Swede" (Alejandro Rose-Garcia) – A lifeguard at the pool where Julie works at the beginning of Season 2. Julie is attracted to him. After Gracie Belle is born, her attraction to him and her tumultuous home life cause her to break up with Matt and pursue a relationship with "The Swede". However, she finds out (as Tami warned her) that he is a party animal with no interest in a serious relationship, which depresses her.
 Noah Barnett (Austin Nichols) – A young teacher at Dillon High in Season 2. Julie strikes up a friendship with him after finding out the truth about "The Swede". Tami mistakes this for a sexual interest, and tells him off, which leads to further friction between her and Julie.
 Guy Raston (Joey Oglesby) – A meth dealer who Tim Riggins moves in with after leaving his home and being kicked out of Tyra's house. He lets Tim stay if he feeds his ferrets. After waking up to Guy pointing a gun at him, Tim leaves. He later steals money from Guy to pay off the mortgage on his house, which Guy demands back. After Tim does pay him back (with money Lyla gave him) they part on bad terms. In Season 3 Billy attempts to sell him stolen copper wire, which doesn't work.
 Jean Binnel (Brea Grant) – A girl who dates Landry briefly in Season 2. She notices his complicated relationship with Tyra, and demands he choose. Landry chooses Tyra.
 Lauren Davis (Kim Smith) – A cheerleader who briefly dates Matt after his breakup with Julie. After he develops feelings for Carlotta, he asks Smash how to break up with a woman. Smash tells him to ask for an open relationship. Matt does so, and Lauren breaks up with him.
 Roberta "Bobbie" Roberts (Alanna Ubach) – The coach of the girls' soccer team at Dillon High. When Taylor becomes athletic director, she bombards him with requests for equipment.
 Morris "Mo" McArnold (Peter Berg) – Tami's high school sweetheart ex-boyfriend, who she broke up with to be with Eric. Mo, now a real estate developer in Dallas comes to Dillon to buy some shopping centers, is still attracted to Tami. He and Eric get into a fight when Mo accuses Eric of stealing Tami away from him and Eric's jealousy of Mo and Tami's past relationship gets out of control. 
 Kevin Turner (Taylor Nichols) - Pam's boyfriend, later husband, after her divorce from Buddy. He and the family, except for Lyla, move to California between Season 2 and Season 3. He is a hipster, and a vegetarian. Due to absorbing his ideas, Buddy Jr. and Tabby do not show respect to their father in Season 3. Later, Buddy implies the marijuana Pam claims Buddy Jr. is smoking comes from Kevin.

Introduced in Season 3
 Shelby Saracen (née Garrett) (Kim Dickens) — Mother of Matt Saracen, she was largely absent throughout Matt's life, until his struggles with his grandmother forced him to seek her out, so that she could sign papers to legally emancipate him. She ends up staying in Dillon with Matt and his grandmother, though it takes some time for Lorraine to accept her help.
 J.D. McCoy (Jeremy Sumpter) — A very talented, but over-privileged quarterback who joins the varsity team as a freshman and eventually replaces Matt Saracen as the starter. During his freshman year, his overbearing father Joe attempts to bribe Coach Taylor into starting him. He has trouble relating to his older teammates who don't share his straight-laced habits. In the fourth season, J.D. becomes heavily arrogant due to Joe becoming President of the Booster Club, and Wade Aikmen becoming head coach of the Panthers. In the fifth season it is revealed during the East Dillon/Dillon game that he is no longer the starting QB of the Panthers, even though at this point, he would be a Junior. The reason for this, is that after the loss to East Dillon at the end of Season 4, J.D., Joe McCoy and Wade Aikmen left Dillon. As a Dillon Panther he wore the number 12. His further arrogance makes him the secondary antagonist of Season 4.
 Joe McCoy (D. W. Moffett) – J.D. McCoy's father, a beer distributor who moved to Dillon recently. He attempts to persuade and eventually bribe Coach Taylor into starting his son. He is later shown to be controlling of J.D.'s life, not allowing him to drink soda or alcohol or eat candy or fast food. He is upset when J.D. screws up in the slightest, and later even more when he starts dating Madison, seeing her as a distraction. He hits J.D., resulting in the Taylors calling CPS. Joe gets revenge by having Eric replaced as head coach by J.D.'s personal coach Wade Aikmen. In Season 4 he is head of the booster club, and antagonizes Tami after she has Luke Cafferty transferred to East Dillon High. He tells Tami that he and Katie are getting a divorce. In the season finale, he is surprised after the Dillon Panthers lose, and lose their way to state. In Season 5, he, J.D. and Wade have left Dillon. His actions make him the main antagonist of Seasons 3 and 4.
 Katie McCoy (Janine Turner) – J.D. McCoy's mother, Joe's wife. She is less controlling of her son's life, wanting him to focus on activities other than football. In Season 3, she and Tami Taylor form a friendship, which ends after the Taylors call CPS. In Season 4, she does not appear, but Joe mentions that he and Katie are getting a divorce.
 Wade Aikmen (Drew Waters) – J.D. McCoy's personal coach, hired by Joe. He replaces Mac McGill temporarily after he suffers a heart attack. Joe later engineers the firing of Coach Taylor and has him replaced with Aikmen. In Season 4, he is the head coach of the Panthers. In Season 5, he, Joe and J.D. have left Dillon.
 Jamarcus Hall (Sinqua Walls) – A new player in Season 3. He replaces Tim Riggins as fullback due to the fact that Tim Riggins has become running back after Smash Williams' graduation. In "Keeping Up Appearances" he is revealed to have forged his parents' signatures on the consent forms that would allow him to play football. His father pulls him from the team, revealing that he does not care about football, and that he is an engineer who moves every few years due to his career, thus the family is just "passing through". Eric and Tami persuade him to give Jamarcus another chance, and they appear to be proud of him when they see him play and have the respect of his teammates. He does not appear in Seasons 4 and 5. It is unknown whether this is because his family has moved again or due to other reasons. As a Dillon Panther he wore the number 1.
 Devin Boland (Stephanie Hunt) – A new student in Season 3 who joins Landry's band. At one point Landry drives her home and kisses her. She later comes out to him as a lesbian. Despite this, they maintain a friendship, and she helps him try to get over Tyra. In Season 4 she attends East Dillon High, also becoming friends with Julie, and at one point mentions her parents are getting a divorce. In Season 3, the credits showed her last name as "Corrigan", though this could be attributed to her parents' divorce.
 Madison Balman (Whitney Hoy) – A girl who shows interest in J.D. McCoy in Season 3. Katie approves of their relationship, while Joe does not, seeing it as a distraction. He attempts to tell J.D. to be on break with her, which J.D. initially does, but later starts to date her. In Season 4, she is not seen, and they appear to have broken up, since J.D. shows interest in Julie. It is possible the break up was due to J.D.'s increasingly arrogant attitude.
 Cash Waller (Zach Roerig) – A cowboy who dates Tyra in Season 3. Initially, he comes across as charming, but is later revealed to have a gambling problem, as well as a temper.
 Paul Dunley (David Born) – The superintendent for Dillon High. He appears to agree with Tami's views, but understands that the community needs to be appeased to get any funds at all.
 Clint Trucks (Brandon Smith) - The vice principal at Dillon High. He tells Tyra she cannot get into the colleges she wants, and later disapproves of the way she runs her campaign. Tami tries to defend her, but agrees with Trucks' opinion.
 Jimmy Adler (Caleb Landry Jones) - The drummer for Landry's band.
 Grant Halbert (Scottie Jeffries) - A former football player for Westerby who became a sports agent in New York. He is about to sign Wendell Foley, a former teammate of Jason Street who went pro, and invites Jason to visit him if he is ever in New York. When Jason does go to New York, he attempts to get a job at Grant's firm, but Grant refuses, telling him he only invited him to get information on Wendell, who has chosen to sign with someone else. He is impressed when Jason gets Wendell to come back and sign with him, and helps Jason get an entry level position at his firm due to this.
 Wendell Foley (Galen Flemons) - A former Panther two years older than Jason Street who went pro after graduating. He introduces Jason to his soon to be agent Grant Halbert. When Jason follows up and finds out Wendell chose a different agent, he persuades him to return to Grant, on the grounds that Grant will take care of him instead of seeing him as another statistic, which gets him a job at Grant's firm.

Introduced in Season 4
 Levi Burnwell (Troy Hogan) – Alumni and Principal for East Dillon High introduced in season 4. Former teacher at West Dillon High prior to East Dillon's reopening. Although Levi views football to be an expensive burden for EDHS, he is seen many times in the stands cheering the Lions on for moral support.
 Dallas Tinker (LaMarcus Tinker) – An East Dillon Lion known to his teammates by his last name, Tinker is part of a core group of players including Vince Howard, Luke Cafferty, Hastings Ruckle and Buddy Garrity, Jr. Tinker once helped Luke mend a fence on his parents' farm when no one else showed up; in Season 5, he trades "his" rally girl, Becky, to Luke in exchange for Luke's prize pig. He ultimately joins the Dillon super-team. As an East Dillon Lion he wore the number 79. His teammates often call him "Tink".
 Coach Stan Traub (Russell DeGrazier) – Assistant coach for the East Dillon Lions in seasons 4–5. Store manager at the local Sears in Dillon. Was a former Pop Warner standout coach. Stan is known for repeating of words of what his fellow coaches say. In the season finale, it is unclear if he joined the Dillon Panthers "super team," or if he retired from football coaching altogether.
 Regina Howard (Angela Rawna) – Vince Howard's mother, a former drug addict. After her son gets her into rehab, she is determined to turn her life around.
 Calvin Brown (Ernest James) – Vince Howard's friend in Season 4. He joins the football team, but is kicked off by Coach Taylor after refusing to apologize for getting into a fight with Landry. He is also one of the neighborhood thugs, involved in some crimes. He is the one who entices Billy into opening a chop shop. He later derides Vince for focusing on football rather than crime, and later encourages Vince after he borrows money from his boss, Kennard. In "Injury List" he is shot and killed by rival neighborhood thugs. Vince attends his memorial, where Kennard tells him to help get vengeance. Vince later refuses to kill. During the brief time that he was an East Dillon Lion, he wore the number 23.
 Kennard Royce (Cedric Neal) – A thug in East Dillon. He employs Calvin and later Vince, teaching them how to steal cars. He later loans Vince 5,000 dollars to get his mother into rehab, causing Vince to work for him to pay him back. He attempts to recruit Vince to get revenge after Calvin is killed. When Vince refuses, he threatens to kill him, but decides he isn't worth it. In Season 5 he returns, having killed Calvin's murderer, and demands that Vince pay back the money. Vince struggles with what to do, eventually telling his father about it. Ornette meets Kennard outside the football game, beats him up, takes his gun, and threatens to kill him if he ever approaches Vince again.
 Cheryl Sproles (Alicia Witt) – Becky Sproles' mother, and a bartender in West Dillon. She has sex with Tim Riggins, and later allows him to rent out a trailer on her property. She had Becky in high school, and does not want Becky to make the same mistakes she made. She is often absent from Becky's life, but loves her. When she finds out Becky is pregnant, she demands an abortion. Later, when she thinks Tim is the father, she kicks Tim out. In Season 5, she is working on a casino boat, and Becky is left in the custody of her father and stepmother as a result. She returns in the season finale, causing Becky to move back in with her.
 Bull Sproles (Lee Stringer) – Becky Sproles' father, a truck driver. He visits in Season 4, and gets Becky a dog, but is revealed to have another child with another woman. After her mother returns the dog, Tim tells Becky about the other family, clearly remembering his experiences with his own father. He fights Tim over this, and leaves afterward. In Season 5, he has returned to watch Becky while her mother is on a work trip, but leaves her with her stepmother to work. After he returns, he demands Becky come home. Becky nearly does, but after seeing the way he and Doreen treat her, Mindy allows Becky to continue living with her and Billy.
 Virgil "Big Merry" Merriweather (Steve Harris) – Father of Jess Merriweather and her three brothers. He owns and operates Rays BBQ, a restaurant in East Dillon, where Jess also works. He is a former East Dillon Lions state champion. He initially dislikes football and Coach Taylor's attempt to promote it, but later assists with various schemes, such as hosting a lunch, helping organize a football game in Carroll Park, and giving Taylor advice. He later gives Vince a job at his restaurant, despite not approving of him. In Season 5, he does not appear, but he is mentioned to be opening another restaurant in Dallas, and after he manages to open a franchise there, his family moves to Dallas.
 Bird Merriweather (Lorraine Toussaint) – Jess, Andre, Caleb and Darius' aunt, and Virgil's sister. She manages his restaurant in Season 5 when he is in Dallas on a work trip.
 Andre Merriweather (Charlie Quary) – Jess Merriweather's younger brother, who plays peewee football.
 Caleb Merriweather (Isaac Smith) – Jess Merriweather's younger brother.
 Darius Merriweather (Josh Levi) – Jess Merriweather's younger brother.
 Tom Cafferty (Barry Tubb) – Luke Cafferty's father, a cattle rancher. He shows concern for his son after Luke tells him he impregnated a girl. In Season 5, he and Margaret are proud of Luke after he wins a game as quarterback, and later slightly off-put when they find out he and Becky are in a relationship.
 Margaret Cafferty (Kathleen Griffith) – Luke Cafferty's mother. She is very upset when she finds out Becky aborted her grandchild, and blames Tami for this, which eventually costs her her job. In Season 5, she and Tom are proud of Luke after he wins a game as quarterback, and later slightly off-put when they find out he and Becky are in a relationship.
 Ryan Lowry (Matt Barr) – A partner of the organization "Habitat for Humanity". Julie briefly dates him in Season 4 following her break up with Matt. He later leaves for another project in Arizona.
 Coach Granger (John Swasey) - Briefly a coach for the East Dillon Lions in Season 4. He quits after Calvin Brown throws a football into his face.
 Ken Shaw (Nnamdi Asomugha) - A detective with the East Dillon Police Department. His brother was a football player under Coach Taylor. After Vince is arrested, he brings him to Taylor as part of the "Cops and Jocks" program, allowing Vince to avoid juvie if he plays football.
 Elden Crumpler (Lawrence Gilliard Jr.) – A former gangster who began doing community work after his release from prison. He helps Eric, Buddy and Virgil get the lights in Carroll Park turned back on.

Introduced in Season 5
 Ornette Howard (Cress Williams) – Vince Howard's father, a drug dealer, who was arrested and sent to prison five years before the events of Season 5. In Season 5 he returns to Dillon. Vince at first refuses to accept him, while Regina does. Against Coach Taylor's advice, he attempts to help Vince get scholarships from colleges which show interest. He is arguably the main antagonist of Season 5.
 Doreen Sproles (Heather Kafka) – Becky Sproles' stepmother, who her father has another daughter with. After her mother leaves to work on a casino boat in Season 5, Becky is left in her custody when her father drives his truck. After being unable to handle her, she moves in with Billy and Mindy Riggins.
 Epyck Sanders (Emily Rios) – A troubled student at East Dillon High. She lives in a foster home, and does not care much about schoolwork. She skips class, smokes on school property, and lies about the situation her foster home is in. Tami tries to give her guidance, but eventually she steals money from another teacher, and accidentally throws Tami's head against a wall, for which she is arrested and transferred to a different school and foster home. Taylor consoles Tami by saying she did everything she could, unsubtly implying you can't help someone who doesn't want help.
 Maura Friedman (Denise Williamson) – A free spirited student at East Dillon High. She becomes Vince's rally girl, and puts her panties in his locker, which Jess gets into a fight with her over. She later drinks too much at a party, which is filmed, and revealed to the community, damaging the Lions' reputation.
 Derek Bishop (Gil McKinney) – Julie Taylor's history TA at college. They have an affair, despite the fact that he is married. When his wife finds out she slut-shames Julie in front of her entire dorm, causing her to move back home for a while. He later meets Tami when she picks up Julie's things. After he comes by the Taylor's house to see Julie, Eric throws him out. He tries to reconcile with her by phone, but she refuses.
 Laurel Sachs (Lynn Blackburn) - A history teacher at East Dillon High who becomes friends with Tami Taylor following her transfer there. Epyck later steals money from her purse, causing a confrontation resulting in Tami's injury and Epyck's arrest.
 Bob Short (Akin Babatunde) - The owner of a gardening store in East Dillon. He admires Vince, and later gives Regina a job at his store.

 
Characters